The Westgate Pedestrian and Cycle Bridge is a motorway overbridge crossing the Northwestern Motorway near Westgate in Auckland, New Zealand. Construction began in late 2012 and was completed in January 2013.

The  bridge catering for both pedestrians and cyclists, as well as mobility-impaired users. It was designed and built by Jasmax architects, Aurecon Consulting Engineers and HEB Construction, and cost approximately $6 million, paid for by Auckland Transport and NZTA. The initial bridge works included work in the Manutewhau Walk Reserve on the eastern side of the bridge, including replacing pine trees with native trees.

Initially, the main function is to provide a west–east connection for the local area, though in the long run, it is intended to link into a future extension of the Northwestern Cycleway up to the bridge.

History 
It was initially approved in the mid 2008s, as a response to a 2004 death of an 11-year-old boy hit by a van while he was crossing the motorway, and in response to continued illegal crossing over the motorway of several dozen people daily, trying to avoid long detours in reaching the nearby shopping centre west of the motorway from the suburbs to the east. However, from the time to approval until construction start, it took another four years until funding was allocated.

References

External links 
 Westgate Pedestrian and Cycle Bridge (official Auckland Transport page with concept images)

Bridges in Auckland
Pedestrian bridges in New Zealand
Cyclist bridges in New Zealand
Bridges completed in 2012
2010s architecture in New Zealand
Transport buildings and structures in the Auckland Region